Bujeon station is a train station in Busan, South Korea, and located in downtown Seomyeon, Busan. The station is the terminus of the Donghae Line and the Bujeon Line. In addition, KTX trains on the Gyeongbu Line are planned to stop at the station.

Services 
The station is served by Mugunghwa-ho trains on the Gyeongjeon Line connecting Bujeon with Mokpo, South Jeolla Province, the Donghae Line connecting Bujeon with Pohang, North Gyeongsang Province, and the Jungang Line connecting Bujeon with Cheongnyangni, Seoul.

History
Service commenced at this station on April 1, 1943.

April 1, 1943: Service commenced 
January 11, 1944: Promotion in status
May 16, 1945: Promotion in status to normal station
January 4, 1965: New construction ordered
December 2003: Present construction ordered

Gallery

See also
Korean National Railroad

References 

Railway stations in Busan
Busanjin District
Railway stations opened in 1943